Salomé is a 1918 American silent drama film produced by William Fox and starring actress Theda Bara.

Plot
As described in a film magazine, Salome uses her wiles in pursuit of King Herod, whose power she desires. She has disposed of Herod's chief rival, and causes his wife to be killed through her own treachery. John the Baptist, who has secured a hold on the people, denounces Herod and his court. Herod has John thrown in jail for fomenting sedition. There Salome meets him, and becomes crazed with passion, but when John rejects her she seeks revenge. With a sensuous dance she gains the approval of Herod, and demands John's head as her reward. This act brings her own punishment when she is crushed to death beneath the sharp spokes on the shields of the Roman legionnaires.

Cast
 Theda Bara as Salome
 G. Raymond Nye as King Herod
 Albert Roscoe as John the Baptist
 Herbert Heyes as Sejanus (Heyes' final of five films with Bara)
 Bertram Grassby as Prince David
 Genevieve Blinn as Queen Marian
 Vera Doria as Naomi
 Alfred Fremont as Galla

Production notes
Portions of the film were shot in Palm Springs, California.

Reception

Although the film proved to be popular with some theaters charging extra for tickets to see it, Salomé also proved to be controversial. For example, St. Louis, Missouri churches of varying denominations organized to protest the showing of the film. They objected not only to Bara's attire, but also to the divergence of the plot from Biblical text, such as scenes where John the Baptist was preaching in Jerusalem and where Salome declares her love to John, and to the youthful appearance of John. Objections were also made that children were attending showings of the film. In response, director Edwards stated that his Salomé was not based upon any single version of the story, but was a combination of many versions and used poetic license.<ref name="Reply">{{cite journal |title=Defend Salome'''s Lack of Clothing: Theda Bara and her Director, J. Gordon Edwards, Reply to Critics of Star's Characterization |journal=Moving Picture World |volume=39 |issue=8 |page=1059 |publisher=Chalmers Publishing Company |location=New York City |date=Feb 22, 1919 |url=https://archive.org/details/movingwor39chal |accessdate=2014-07-25}}</ref> Edwards also noted the film had a "big, moral lesson" since "Salome, according to a consensus of literary opinion, was the wanton creature criminal history has given us" and who "drove the most diabolical bargain that has ever been known" by bartering "a dance for the head of a man."

Like many American films of the time, Salomé was subject to restrictions and cuts by city and state film censorship boards. For example, the Chicago Board of Censors required a cut, in Reel 5, of a closeup of Salome in a litter where she raises her arm and exposes a breast, Reel 6, scene of executioner's sword descending, and, Reel 8, in two scenes where Salome is shown bending over dungeon, portions of film where her breasts are exposed.

Preservation statusSalomé is now considered to be a lost film,Salome at TheGreatStars.com; Lost Films Wanted(Wayback Machine) though two minutes worth of fragments are held by the Filmoteca Española, who uploaded them to Vimeo on October 2, 2021.

French film preservationist and historian Henri Langlois said he had the opportunity to buy this film but dismissed it as he felt that the film was not considered a classic. He subsequently realized his lost chance and regretted prejudging which films as worthy of preserving, deciding instead to preserve whatever film he was able to.

In popular culture
A scene in the 1918 film The Cook'', starring Roscoe "Fatty" Arbuckle and Buster Keaton, spoofs parts of this movie, with Arbuckle dressing in drag and doing his best "Salomé" impression.

See also
 List of American films of 1918
 List of lost films
 1937 Fox vault fire

References

External links

 
 
 Alternate lobby poster
 Film still at silenthollywood.com
 , Filmoteca Española (2 minutes)

1918 films
1918 drama films
Fox Film films
Silent American drama films
American silent feature films
American black-and-white films
Films directed by J. Gordon Edwards
Films set in the 1st century
Films shot in California
Lost American films
Cultural depictions of John the Baptist
1918 lost films
Lost drama films
Cultural depictions of Salome
1910s American films